Jantar  (formerly known in Polish between 1945 and 1947 as Paców) is a village in the administrative district of Gmina Stegna, within Nowy Dwór Gdański County, Pomeranian Voivodeship, in northern Poland.

The word "Jantar" comes from the Lithuanian word for amber.

The village has a population of 1008.

Gallery

See also
Junoszyno
Mikoszewo

References

Jantar